LC9 was a South Korean pop boy band formed by Nega Network. The group initially consisted of six members until member E.Den left to pursue his studies. Their name, LC9, means League of Competition #9. They debuted on May 9, 2013, with "MaMa Beat" on Mnet M! Countdown. The music video was released on the same day.

On January 23, 2016, the group's label announced that LC9 disbanded. Their contract wasn't renewed back on December 21, 2015, which led the group to an end.

History

2013–15: Career beginnings
Around April, Nega Network announced that they would be debuting a male group, currently nicknamed Brown Eyed Boys inspired by their fellow label seniors Brown Eyed Girls. After a series of teasers introducing each of the members, they made their official debut as LC9 on May 9, 2013, with their first mini album Skirmish, with the title track "MaMa Beat" featuring label-mate Gain. On the same day, LC9 held their debut stage on Mnet M! Countdown.

2016: Disbandment
On January 23, 2016, Nega Network revealed that the group's contract ended on December 21 of the previous year. None of the members renewed their contracts, and LC9 dissolved as a result.

Members

Former
 Rasa – leader, vocals, rapper
 J-Hyo – vocals, rapper
 King – vocals
 Jun – rapper
 AO – vocals, rapper 
 E.Den – rapper

Discography

Extended plays

Singles

Videography

Music videos

References

External links
 

2013 establishments in South Korea
2015 disestablishments in South Korea
Musical groups disestablished in 2015
Musical groups established in 2013
Musical groups from Seoul
South Korean boy bands
South Korean dance music groups